This is a list of chaconnes composed in the 17th century.  Included are all pieces of 17th-century music, or clearly marked off sections of pieces, labeled "chaconne" (or some variant of that word) by their composers, that have been found by contributors to this article among the works of musicians, musicologists, and music historians.  A few pieces not labeled "chaconne" by their composers, when they have been clearly identified as chaconnes by later commentators, have also been included.  A definitive list would be impossible to make, because there was in the 17th century, and there remains today, disagreement about the defining characteristics of a chaconne. That subject is treated in the article Chaconne.

Jump to decade:

Bibliography

 
 
 
 
  
 
 
 
 
 
 
 
  
 
 
  3 vols. in 1.
  
  
 
 
 
 
 
 
  
 
 
  
  
  
 
 
  
 
 
  

 
 
 
 
 
 
 
  
 
 
 
 
  

 
 
 

Chaconnes